Stephen Jackson  (1890 – 26 October 1917) was an English professional footballer who played as a full back in the Southern Football League for Coventry City.

Personal life
Jackson was married. In September 1914, a month after the outbreak of the First World War, he enlisted as a sergeant in the South Staffordshire Regiment. Jackson served at Gallipoli and was wounded, being transferred to France upon his recovery. In April 1917, he was awarded the Military Medal for conduct displayed during fighting at Bullecourt. Jackson was later appointed as an acting company sergeant major and was awarded the Distinguished Conduct Medal for conduct during a trench raid at Bullecourt.

Jackson was killed in action on 26 October 1917 during his battalion's attack on a fortification southwest of Gheluvelt, Belgium. He is buried at Perth (China Wall) Cemetery.

Career statistics

References

1890 births
Date of birth unknown
1917 deaths
Sportspeople from Smethwick
Association football fullbacks
English footballers
Southern Football League players
Coventry City F.C. players
British Army personnel of World War I
South Staffordshire Regiment soldiers
Recipients of the Distinguished Conduct Medal
Recipients of the Military Medal
British military personnel killed in World War I
Burials at Perth (China Wall) Commonwealth War Graves Commission Cemetery
Military personnel from Staffordshire